Erika Celeste is an American journalist who has worked in radio, print, and television since 1992. Among other things she has collected 2 Emmys, a Telly, and several AP Awards.

She has worked for every major news network affiliate including ABC, NBC, CBS, CNN and PBS. She has also freelanced for many national and international organizations including Voice of America, Public Radio International and National Public Radio. Celeste worked as executive editor of COMAR, Inc. a West Virginia publishing company, directly editing West Virginia Executive magazine. In addition she has written several documentaries including Red Salt and Reynolds, Just Like Anyone, and the forthcoming Secrets of the Valley (fall 2010) narrated by Morgan Spurlock of Super Size Me fame.

She is the founder and owner of New Moon Media Group began out of a love for journalism and entertainment. Despite working in the field as a 'day job' Celeste enjoyed the adventure of traveling to new places, meeting new people, and learning new things, that she often found herself working as a hobby at night and on the weekends.

Along the way Celeste made contacts with many interesting people from movie producers and directors, to writers and editors, graphic artists and printers. Today she works with many of them through New Moon Media Group.

Early years
Celeste spent most of her childhood in Minnesota. She is the oldest of eight children.  Her father Wayne Brass is a retired UCC pastor, her mother Renee Brass, is a retired BSN. Later she attended Western Michigan University, then transferred to University of Indianapolis, and graduated from Indiana State University with a focus in Theater and Communications and Anthropology. She married Michael Hobbs, a high school sweetheart and they had Kaleb Hunter before divorcing (1999).

Personal life
Erika Celeste is married to Michael Marturello the editor of the Herald Republican. The couple spent several years as foster parents. During that time Celeste was stalked by someone related to one of her foster children. Unable to do anything about her own ordeal, Celeste worked with Indiana Representative Dennis Zent (R) Steuben to change the law. In a single season of lobbying, the law was passed (2016) making it a felony to stalk foster parents in the line of duty. Celeste and her husband later adopted 2 children: Christopher Rollin in 2017 and Chloe in 2020.

Work
Several of Celeste's stories can be found through a simple Google search of her name and various media outlets. Such stories as ayahuasca, alpacas, and adventure racing have met with much attention on Voice of America's website. Many of her stories have been translated into numerous languages including: Burmese, Croatian, Chinese, German, Korean, Spanish, and Taiwanese. Other stories she has recently written on refugee issues and a disabled driver were featured on NPR.

Additionally, Celeste is the co-owner of The Original Rolling Stone LLC along with Rockabilly Hall of Famer Andy Anderson. The two co-authored a book entitled Memoirs of the Original Rolling Stone. "The Survival Wedding Guide" with Suzanne Franco, "Follow Your Heart" with Phil Devitte, "The Story of a Forgotten Warrior and PTSD" with Carol Blake and she has ghostwritten several other human interest stories and biographies.

Celeste continues to freelance for such groups as Business Insider, MSNBC, and various NPR programs. In 2019 she started TBH or To Be Honest Inc (http:www.tobehonestinc.com). The nonprofit works with several high schools and organizations around the state of Indiana to produce a teen shot, edited, and hosted TV series that airs on PBS affiliates. In 2021 she started Haven't Met Forever which can be found on TikTok @haventmetforever as well as online also at www.haventmetforever. Her focus with this endeavor is to report, write, and raise awareness on foster, adoption, and child trauma issues.

Awards
 2013 Hollywood Book Festival, Honorable Mention, Biography/Autobiography, Follow Your Heart
 2010 Secrets of the Valley, Paradise Film Institute, Telly 
 2010 Society of Environmental Journalists, Second Place, Outstanding Beat/In-depth Reporting, Coal: Dirty Past, Hazy Future, radio documentary
 2007 CASE III, Advancement Awards, Special Merit Award, Step into the Maroon
 2007 Mississippi Association of Broadcasters, Excellence in Broadcasting, Silver, A Million Stories, TV series
 2007 CPRAM, First Place, Bulldog Tryouts, senior division TV spots
 2007 CPRAM, Second Place, Step into the Maroon, senior division TV spots
 2007 CPRAM, Second Place, High Notes, senior division, radio program
 2006 CASE III Advancement Awards, Award of Excellence for High Notes, Radio
 2004 Emmy for Campbell’s Creek Sniper
 2003 Emmy nomination for Red Salt & Reynolds
 2003 Telly Award for Red Salt & Reynolds
 2003 Best Written Historical Documentary at West Virginia Filmmakers Film Festival
 2002 Best Feature, WV AP Broadcasters Association
 2002 Second Place, Beat Coverage, Association of Capitol Reporters and Editors
 2001 First Place, Political Coverage, Association of Capitol Reporters and Editors

Sources
 https://haventmetforever.com
 https://tobehonestinc.com
 https://muckrack.com/erika-celeste/articles
 http://www.ecnewmoon.com
 http://www.voanews.com
 https://www.npr.org
 http://www.authorhouse.com/bookStore/ItemDetail.aspx?bookid=60866

American women journalists
Living people
Year of birth missing (living people)
Western Michigan University alumni
University of Indianapolis alumni
Indiana State University alumni
21st-century American women